The 10th NACAC U18 and U23 Championships in Athletics were held in Queretaro, Mexico from July 5–7, 2019.
 It was the first time that an U18 competition was added to the event alongside the U23 category.

Medal summary

For medal winners and complete results, see footnotes

U23 men

U23 women

U23 mixed

U18 boys

U18 girls

U18 mixed

Medal table (U23)

Medal table (U18)

Participation (U23)

 (2)
 (10)
 (6)
 (2)
 (1)
 (5)
 (25)
 (4)
 (2)
 (4)
 (3)
 (2)
 (3)
 (2)
 (8)
 (2)
 (1)
 (26)
 (76)
 (6)
 (1)
 (7)
 (3)
 (3)
 (71)
 (6)

References

External links
 NACAC Home Page
 Meet Results
 meet history
 News of meet history

NACAC Under-23 Championships in Athletics
NACAC Under-18 Championships in Athletics
Sport in Mexico
Nacac U18 and U23 Championships
Nacac U18 and U23 Championships
International athletics competitions hosted by Mexico
Nacac U18 and U23 Championships
Nacac U18 and U23 Championships